The Institute for Basic Science (IBS) is a Korean government-funded research institute that conducts basic science research and relevant pure basic research. IBS was established in November 2011 by the Lee Myung-bak administration as a research institute, later be a core of the International Science and Business Belt (ISBB) upon relocation of their headquarters from a rented property to their own campus in January 2018 using land reclaimed from the Taejŏn Expo '93 in Expo Science Park. Comprising 30 research centers with 68 research groups across the nation and a headquarters in Daejeon, IBS has approximately 1,800 researchers and doctoral course students. Around 30% of the researchers are from countries outside of South Korea. The organization is under the Ministry of Science and ICT.

In 2011, the Korean government announced an investment of more than 2 trillion KRW (roughly US$2 billion) to build a heavy ion accelerator facility, named RAON, in northern Daejeon by 2021 before getting pushed back to 2025. The facility is expected to be the world's first device using both the isotope separator on-line (ISOL) and in-flight (IF) methods.

From December 2018, the IBS Center for Climate Physics, headed by Axel Timmermann, began to utilize a 1.43-petaflop Cray XC50 supercomputer, named Aleph, for climate physics research.

Organizational structure 

IBS consists primarily of a headquarters (HQ) and secondary units in the form of research centers. IBS plans to establish a total of 50 research centers, employing 3,000 people.

IBS research centers are divided into several categories: HQ, campus, extramural, and pioneer research. HQ Centers' research groups are affiliated solely with IBS. Campus Centers are based in the nation's science and technology universities (KAIST, DGIST, UNIST, GIST and POSTECH). Extramural Centers are based in universities other than science and technology universities (Seoul National University, Sungkyunkwan University, Korea University, Yonsei University, Ewha Womans University, and Pusan National University). Pioneer Research Centers (PRC) are headquarters-based centers headed not by a director, but by a group of up to five chief investigators.

As of January 2020, there are 30 centers operating in various fields of science including 6 in chemistry, 6 in life science, 5 in interdisciplinary science, 10 in physics, 1 in Earth science, and 2 in mathematics. The centers are located at IBS HQ in Daejeon and relevant universities in Seoul, Suwon, Daegu, Ulsan, Pohang, Busan, Daejeon, and Gwangju. The annual budget for each center ranges from 2 to US$10 million. Once launched, centers run with no fixed time frame to conduct their research.

There are two affiliated organizations: the National Institute for Mathematical Sciences (NIMS), and the Rare Isotope Science Project (RISP).

IBS Presidents
 Oh Se-jung (November 25, 2011–February 2014) Ph.D. in physics from Stanford University, Professor in the Department of Physics and Astronomy at Seoul National University, and 2nd President of the National Research Foundation of Korea
Kim Doochul (September 2014–September 2019) Ph.D. in electrical engineering from Johns Hopkins University, Professor in the Department of Physics at Seoul National University, and 5th President of the Korea Institute for Advanced Study
Noh Do Young  (November 22, 2019–current) Ph.D. in physics from Massachusetts Institute of Technology, Professor in the Department of Physics and Photon Science at Gwangju Institute of Science and Technology (GIST), director of the Center for Advanced X-ray Science, president of Korea Synchrotron Radiation User's Association, dean of GIST College

Educational Programs 
IBS School, University of Science and Technology

IBS School is a graduate program jointly founded by IBS and the University of Science and Technology (UST) in Korea. The school opened in September 2015 to foster young scientists in basic science by utilizing HQ Centers' facilities.

IBS Young Scientist Fellowship (YSF)

IBS has been running this program since 2013 to provide opportunities for early career researchers (postdocs with less than 5 years' experience or those under the age of 40 with a Ph.D.) to gain research experience by carrying out independent research within IBS centers.

See also 
Riken
Max Planck Society
Korea Institute for Advanced Study
Facility for Rare Isotope Beams
On-Line Isotope Mass Separator
Okinawa Institute of Science and Technology Graduate University

References

External links

  (English and Korean)
 Special Act of Establishment of and Support for International Science and Business Belt Korea Legislation Research Institute

 
Research institutes established in 2011
2011 establishments in South Korea
Daejeon
Research institutes in South Korea